Marva or Marwa is one of the ten basic thaats of Hindustani music from the Indian subcontinent. It is also the name of a raga within this thaat.

Description
Marva thaat is obtained by adding a komal Rishabh to the Kalyan thaat. The mood of the Marva family of ragas is strongly and easily recognisable.

Ragas
Other ragas in Marva thaat:

Marva
Puriya
Sohni
Lalit (although it is sometimes placed in Purvi thaat)
Bibhas (two other types of Bibhas are placed in Bhairav thaat or Purvi thaat)
Pancham (Hindol Pancham)
Maligaura
Purba (Purbya)
Purvakalyan
Jait (Jayat) (not to be confused with Jait Kalyan
Varati (raga)
Bhatiyar
Bhankar
Lalita Gauri (sometimes placed in Purvi thaat)
Sazgiri

According to O. Thakur Pūrvā Kalyāṇa is Marwa with Pa and less emphasis on komal Re. R. Jha treats Bhaṭiya as a mixture of Marwa and Maand. There is only one Author (B. Subba Rao) mentioning a raga Māravā Gaurī, thus Moutal does not consider this an own form. Aspects of Marwa are also incorporated in Mali Gaura.

Notes

References
 
 
 

Hindustani music theory